The Potter Valley AVA is an American Viticultural Area located in northern Mendocino County, California centered on town of Potter Valley. The appellation is found east of the Redwood Valley AVA and has an elevation of around  higher than surrounding areas. The influence of the nearby Eel River watershed has created conditions conducive to the production of botrytized wines - especially Riesling, Sauvignon blanc and Semillon.

Wine grape growers in Potter Valley include McFadden and Todd Family Farms.

See also
Mendocino County wine

References

American Viticultural Areas
American Viticultural Areas of California
American Viticultural Areas of Mendocino County, California
1983 establishments in California